This is a list of All Elite Wrestling pay-per-view events, detailing all wrestling shows promoted on pay-per-view (PPV) by All Elite Wrestling (AEW).

The formation of AEW was announced on January 1, 2019, with the promotion holding its inaugural event, Double or Nothing, which doubled as its inaugural PPV event, on May 25. Double or Nothing is regarded as AEW's marquee event; furthermore, AEW President and Chief Executive Officer Tony Khan referred to Double or Nothing, All Out, Full Gear, and Revolution as being the promotion's "big four" PPVs, their four biggest shows of the year produced quarterly. From March 2020 to July 2021, the majority of AEW's events were held at Daily's Place in Jacksonville, Florida due to the COVID-19 pandemic. AEW began readmitting a limited number of fans in August 2020 and then ran full capacity shows in May 2021 before the promotion returned to live touring in mid-July.

AEW pay-per-views are available via Warner Bros. Discovery's Bleacher Report service in the United States and Canada, and on FITE TV in other international markets. They are also available via traditional PPV outlets in the U.S. and Canada, and carried by all major satellite providers and is also shown in select locations of the Cineplex Entertainment theatre chain in Canada. On February 19, 2020, AEW reached a new media rights deal with German media company Sky Deutschland, owned by Comcast (WWE's U.S. broadcast partner, which previously broadcast WWE and Impact Wrestling shows), to broadcast its PPVs on Sky Select Event. On August 6, 2020, AEW and Sky Italia (also owned by Comcast) agreed to broadcast their PPVs on Sky Primafila. On August 2, 2021, AEW signed a deal with Eurosport to broadcast their TV and PPV content in India.

Past events

2019

Notes
Fyter Fest and Fight for the Fallen only aired on pay-per-view internationally. In the United States, both events aired for free on the B/R Live streaming service. The events since have been held as special episodes of Dynamite, and later, Rampage.

2020

2021

2022

2023

Upcoming events

2023

Most pay-per-view matches
These eleven wrestlers have the most PPV matches as of Revolution 2023.

See also
 List of All Elite Wrestling special events
 List of AEW Dynamite special episodes
 List of ECW supercards and ppv events
 List of FMW supercards and ppv events
 List of GFW specials and ppv events
 List of MLW specials and ppv events
 List of NWA ppv events
 List of NJPW ppv events
 List of ROH ppv events
 List of SMW supercard events
 List of TNA / Impact Wrestling ppv events
 List of WCCW supercard events
 List of WCW closed-circuit events and ppv events
 List of WCW Clash of the Champions shows
 List of WWE ppv and WWE Network events
 List of WWE Saturday Night Main Event shows
 List of WWE Tribute to the Troops shows

Notes

References

External links

Events
Professional wrestling-related lists
All Elite Wrestling